Coso or COSO may refer to:

Coso (former settlement), California
Coso Junction, California
Coso Range, in eastern California
Coso Hot Springs, in the Coso Volcanic Field
Coso Volcanic Field, in southeastern California
Coso artifact, found in 1961
Coso people, Native American tribe associated with the Coso Range

COSO
Cash or share option, a warrant where the settlement is either cash or physical delivery of shares
Committee of Sponsoring Organizations of the Treadway Commission, to combat corporate fraud